Thioredoxin domain-containing protein 5 is a protein that in humans is encoded by the TXNDC5 gene.

Function 

This gene encodes a protein disulfide-isomerase. Its expression is induced by hypoxia and its role may be to protect hypoxic cells from apoptosis. This gene can be co-transcribed with the upstream gene MUTED.

References

Further reading 

 
 
 
 
 
 

Endoplasmic reticulum resident proteins